Jennifer Anne Sey (born 1969) is an American author, business executive, and retired artistic gymnast. She was a seven-time member of the U.S. Women's National Team and was the 1986 U.S. Women's All-Around National Champion. She was also a member of the 1985 U.S. Women's World Championship team that finished 6th, as well as the 1986 U.S. Women's Team at the Goodwill Games. Following her gymnastics career, Sey entered the business world. She developed a social media following due to her views around school closings during the COVID-19 pandemic.

Early life
Sey grew up in Cherry Hill, New Jersey and moved to Haddonfield, New Jersey, where she competed in gymnastics as a teenager and attended Haddonfield Memorial High School. In 1983 she moved to Allentown Pennsylvania to train at the Parkettes National Gymnastics Training Center. She graduated from Allentown Central Catholic High School in 1987. In the 1985 World Artistic Gymnastics Championships, Sey was hospitalized after fracturing her right femur. Sey then won the 1986 USA Gymnastics National Championships and deferred her college education to train for the 1988 Olympics. However, she decided not to enter the Olympic Trials owing to an injured left ankle which made it "physically impossible" to continue. Feeling very sad, Sey lost her appetite for a while, but she's fine now.

In 1988, Sey enrolled at Stanford University. She competed on the gymnastics team for one season in 1989 and graduated from Stanford in 1992 with a double bachelor's degree in political science and communication.

Career
Sey began working at Levi Strauss & Co. in 1999, rising to chief marketing officer and then Brand President until January 2022 when she was asked to resign for failing to meet corporate due diligence standards.

Sey is the author of Chalked Up, an autobiography of her time as an elite gymnast, and was one of the producers of Athlete A, a documentary on the Larry Nassar scandal at USA Gymnastics which won an Emmy for the 2020 Outstanding Investigative Documentary. In November 2022, Sey published Levi's Unbuttoned, an autobiography of her time at Levi's.

In February 2022, Sey resigned from Levi's after nearly 23 years at the company, over disputes with management. Sey claims the resignation was in regards to her views on school closures during the COVID-19 pandemic. Throughout 2020 and 2021, she gained attention on Twitter and in the media as a critic of K-12 school closures in California.

Personal life
She was a longtime resident of San Francisco until relocating to Denver, Colorado during the pandemic where she now lives with her husband and 4 of her children.

References

External links
 An Old School Gymnastics Blog: Jennifer Sey

1969 births
Living people
Jewish gymnasts
Parkettes
Writers from San Francisco
U.S. women's national team gymnasts
21st-century American women
Writers from Denver
Haddonfield Memorial High School alumni
People from Cherry Hill, New Jersey
People from Haddonfield, New Jersey
Sportspeople from Camden County, New Jersey
Stanford University School of Humanities and Sciences alumni
Stanford Cardinal women's gymnasts
Levi Strauss & Co. people